The following outline is provided as an overview of and topical guide to the Renaissance:

Renaissance – cultural movement that spanned roughly the 14th to the 17th century, beginning in Italy in the Late Middle Ages and later spreading to the rest of Europe. The term is also used more loosely to refer to the historical era, but since the changes of the Renaissance were not uniform across Europe, this is a general use of the term.

Essence of the Renaissance 

Renaissance
 Cultural movement
 Time period, age, or era

History of the Renaissance period 
 Early modern Europe
 High Renaissance

Renaissance developments by field 
Gunpowder warfare
Renaissance architecture
 Renaissance architecture in Central Europe
 Renaissance architecture in Eastern Europe
 Elizabethan architecture (Early English Renaissance architecture)
 French Renaissance architecture
 German Renaissance architecture
Weser Renaissance
 Italian Renaissance architecture
 Polish Cathedral style
 Architecture of the Spanish Renaissance
Renaissance dance
 English Renaissance dance
 French Renaissance dance
 German Renaissance dance
 Italian Renaissance dance
 Spanish Renaissance dance
Renaissance literature
 Dutch Renaissance and Golden Age literature (Netherlands)
 English Renaissance literature
 French Renaissance literature
 German Renaissance literature
 Italian Renaissance literature
 Spanish Renaissance literature
 Swedish reformation and Renaissance literature
Renaissance music
 English Renaissance music
 French Renaissance music
 German Renaissance music
 Italian Renaissance music
 Spanish Renaissance music
Renaissance painting
 Dutch and Flemish Renaissance painting (Netherlands)
 Early Netherlandish painting
 English Renaissance painting
 French Renaissance painting
 German Renaissance painting
 Italian Renaissance painting
 Italian Renaissance painting, development of themes
 Spanish Renaissance painting
Renaissance philosophy
 English Renaissance philosophy
 French Renaissance philosophy
 German Renaissance philosophy
 Italian Renaissance philosophy
 Renaissance humanism
 Spanish Renaissance philosophy
History of science in the Renaissance
Renaissance technology
 English Renaissance technology
 French Renaissance technology
 German Renaissance technology
 Italian Renaissance technology
 Spanish Renaissance technology
 Renaissance theatre
 English Renaissance theatre
 French Renaissance theatre
 German Renaissance theatre
 Italian Renaissance theatre
 Spanish Renaissance theatre

The Renaissance by region 
Italian Renaissance (1450–1600)
Italian Renaissance architecture
Italian Renaissance dance
Italian Renaissance literature
Italian Renaissance music
Italian Renaissance painting
 Italian Renaissance painting, development of themes
Italian Renaissance philosophy
English Renaissance (1588–1629)
Elizabethan architecture (Early English Renaissance architecture)
English Renaissance dance
English Renaissance literature
English Renaissance music
English Renaissance painting
English Renaissance philosophy
English Renaissance science
English Renaissance technology
English Renaissance theatre
French Renaissance (1494–1610)
French Renaissance architecture
French Renaissance dance
French Renaissance literature
French Renaissance music
French Renaissance painting
French Renaissance philosophy
French Renaissance science
French Renaissance technology
French Renaissance theatre
German Renaissance
German Renaissance architecture
Weser Renaissance
German Renaissance dance
German Renaissance literature
German Renaissance music
German Renaissance painting
German Renaissance philosophy
German Renaissance science
German Renaissance technology
German Renaissance theatre
Renaissance in the Netherlands 
Netherlands Renaissance architecture
Netherlands Renaissance dance
Dutch Renaissance and Golden Age literature
Netherlands Renaissance music
Dutch and Flemish Renaissance painting
 Early Netherlandish painting
 Flemish painting
Netherlands Renaissance philosophy
Netherlands Renaissance science
Netherlands Renaissance technology
Netherlands Renaissance theatre
Renaissance in Poland (1500–1650)
Poland Renaissance architecture
 Polish Cathedral style
Poland Renaissance dance
Poland Renaissance literature
Poland Renaissance music
Poland Renaissance painting
Poland Renaissance philosophy
Poland Renaissance science
Poland Renaissance technology
Poland Renaissance theatre
Spanish Renaissance (1550–1587)
Spanish Renaissance architecture
Spanish Renaissance dance
Spanish Renaissance literature
Spanish Renaissance music
Spanish Renaissance painting
Spanish Renaissance philosophy
Spanish Renaissance science
Spanish Renaissance technology
Spanish Renaissance theatre

Renaissance Historiography 

 Historiography of 12th century Renaissance

Other periods of cultural rebirth 
 African Renaissance
 American Renaissance
 Bengal Renaissance
 Byzantine Renaissance
 Carolingian Renaissance
 European Urban Renaissance
 Harlem Renaissance
 Hawaiian Renaissance
 Macedonian Renaissance
 Native American Renaissance
 Neo-Renaissance
 Ottonian Renaissance
 Renaissance of the 12th century
 Russian Religious Renaissance
 San Francisco Renaissance
 Scottish Renaissance
 Southern Renaissance (United States)
 Timurid Renaissance
 Urban renaissance (UK)
 Yiddish Renaissance

General Renaissance-related concepts 
 Allegory in Renaissance literature
 Polymath
 Renaissance fair
 Renaissance Latin
 Renaissance magic
 Renaissance man

Important figures from the Renaissance 

List of Renaissance figures
List of Renaissance figures
Byzantine scholars in the Renaissance
List of Renaissance composers
List of Flemish painters

Renaissance composers 

List of Renaissance composers

Renaissance painters 
Leonardo da Vinci with Michelangelo and Raphael form the traditional trinity of great masters of the Renaissance.

Renaissance philosophers 

 Petrarch (1304–1374)
 Leonardo Bruni (1374–1444)
 Nicholas of Cusa  (1401–1464)
 Lorenzo Valla (1405–1457)
 Marsilio Ficino (1433–1499)
 Pietro Pomponazzi (1462–1525)
 Pico della Mirandola (1463–1494)
 Desiderius Erasmus (1466–1536)
 Niccolò Machiavelli (1469–1527)
 Thomas More (1478–1535)
 Francisco de Vitoria (c.1480–1546)
 Martin Luther (1483–1546)
 Juan Luis Vives (1492–1540)
 Michel de Montaigne (1533–1592)
 Giordano Bruno (1548–1600)
 Francisco Suárez (1548–1617)
 Francis Bacon (1561–1626)
 Galileo Galilei (1564–1642)
 René Descartes  (1596–1650)
 Tommaso Campanella (1568–1639)
 Franciscus Patricius (1529–1597)
 Hugo Grotius (1583–1645)
 Thomas Hobbes (1588–1679)
 Huldrych Zwingli (1484–1531)

Renaissance scholarship
Centre for Renaissance and Early Modern Studies
Renaissance Studies

See also 
 Canons of Renaissance poetry
List of Renaissance structures
List of English Renaissance theatres

External links 

Notable Medieval and Renaissance Women
Ancient and Renaissance women by Dr. Deborah Vess
 

Interactive Resources
 Florence: 3D Panoramas of Florentine Renaissance Sites (English/Italian)
 Multimedia Exploration of the Renaissance
 Virtual Journey to Renaissance Florence
 RSS News Feed: Get an entry from Leonardo's Journal delivered each day
Lectures and Galleries
 The Bagatti Valsecchi Museum
 The Idea of the Renaissance
 The Islamic Foundation of the Renaissance
 Leonardo da Vinci, Gallery of Paintings and Drawings
 Renaissance in the "History of Art"
 The Society for Renaissance Studies

Renaissance
Renaissance
 1